Narrow-leaved peppermint or narrow-leafed peppermint is a common name for several plants and may refer to:

Eucalyptus australis, endemic to Western Australia
Eucalyptus nicholii, native to northern New South Wales
Eucalyptus radiata, native to eastern Australia